The 2015 94.7 Cycle Challenge was held on 15 November 2015, in South Africa over . It was the 15th time the race was held for women, but the first time that the race was classified as an international women's race (UCI category 1.1). The race was won by Ashleigh Moolman, almost a minute ahead of Sabrina Stultiens and Floortje Mackaij.

Results

See also
 2015 in women's road cycling

References

2015 in South African sport
2015 in women's road cycling
Cycle races in South Africa